John Crawford Chaney (February 1, 1853 – April 26, 1940) was an American lawyer and politician who served two terms as a U.S. Representative from Indiana from 1905 to 1909.

Early life and career 
Chaney was born near Lisbon, Ohio in 1854, and later moved to Lafayette Township, Indiana, with his parents, who settled on a farm near Fort Wayne. He attended the common schools, graduating first from Ascension Seminary, Farmersburg, Indiana, in 1874 and later from the Terre Haute Commercial College. He taught school and served as superintendent of schools for five years before graduating from the law school of Cincinnati University in June 1882. Chaney was admitted to the bar in 1883 and commenced practice in Sullivan, Indiana. He served as a member of the state central committee from the second district in 1884 and 1885. In July 1889, he was appointed by President Harrison as assistant to the Attorney General in the Department of Justice, serving in that position until August 1893, when he resigned and resumed the practice of law.

Congress 
Chaney was elected as a Republican to the Fifty-ninth and Sixtieth Congresses (March 4, 1905 – March 3, 1909) for Indiana's 2nd congressional district. He was an unsuccessful candidate for reelection in 1908 to the Sixty-first Congress.

Later career and death 
After leaving the House, he continued the practice of law in Sullivan, Indiana, where he died on April 26, 1940. He was interred in Center Ridge Cemetery.

References

1853 births
1940 deaths
United States Assistant Attorneys General
University of Cincinnati College of Law alumni
People from Lisbon, Ohio
People from Allen County, Indiana
People from Sullivan, Indiana
Republican Party members of the United States House of Representatives from Indiana